Matthew Connor Hennessy (born November 17, 1997) is an American football center for the Atlanta Falcons of the National Football League (NFL). He played college football at Temple.

Early life and high school
Hennessy was born in Nyack, New York and grew up in Bardonia, New York. He attended Don Bosco Preparatory High School in Ramsey, New Jersey and was a starter at offensive tackle as a junior and senior for the Ironmen. A 3-star offensive tackle recruit according to rivals.com, Hennessy committed to play college football at Temple over offers from Air Force, Army, Florida Atlantic, Old Dominion, and Yale, among others.

College career

Hennessy played in three games with one start at left guard as a true freshman before redshirting the rest of the season. He became the Owls' starting center going into his redshirt freshman year, starting all but one game that he missed due to injury. Hennessy was awarded a single-digit jersey (number three) as one of the nine toughest players on the team going into his redshirt sophomore year, which he wore in practice as offensive line are not eligible to wear single digit numbers in-game. He started eleven games, missing two due to injury. Hennessy started 12 games at center for the Owls as a redshirt junior and was named first-team All-American Athletic Conference, second-team All-America by USA Today and to the third-team by the Associated Press and was named a finalist for the Rimington Trophy. Following the end of the season, Hennessy announced that he would forgo his final season of NCAA eligibility to enter the 2020 NFL Draft. Having graduated in December of his redshirt junior year, Hennessy was invited to and played in the 2020 Senior Bowl.

Professional career

Hennessy was selected by the Atlanta Falcons in the third round of the 2020 NFL Draft with the 78th overall selection.

After playing behind Alex Mack as a rookie, Hennessy was named the Falcons starting center in 2021 and started every game. In 2022, he started Week 9 at left guard before suffering a knee injury. He was placed on injured reserve on November 8, 2022. He was activated on December 31 and the started the final two games of the season at left guard.

Personal life
Hennessy's older brother, Thomas Hennessy, is the longsnapper for the New York Jets. Matt and his brother grew up New York Giants fans.

References

External links
Temple Owls bio
Atlanta Falcons bio

1997 births
Living people
American football centers
American football offensive guards
Atlanta Falcons players
Don Bosco Preparatory High School alumni
People from Clarkstown, New York
Players of American football from New York (state)
Sportspeople from the New York metropolitan area
Temple Owls football players